Wuxiang Station is an elevated metro station in Ningbo, Zhejiang, China. Wuxiang Station situates near the crossing of Nantang River and Beilun Railway. Construction of the station started in December 2012, and the station entered into service on March 19, 2016.

Exits 
Wuxiang Station has two exits.

References 

Railway stations in Zhejiang
Railway stations in China opened in 2016
Ningbo Rail Transit stations